John Leech is a radio presenter in the United Kingdom known for his award-winning radio shows. He began his career in the music library at Capital Radio in London in the 1980s. He became the early morning host on Capital Radio and also DJ'd at Capital Radio's Best Disco in Town.

Leechy joined Essex Radio in 1986 where he gained notoriety over a 15-year spell on air.  His evening soul shows set all-time record audience figures for the station.

John Leech has won 12 World Radio Awards for his programmes, including 4 Gold Medals at The New York Festivals, for excellence in professional broadcasting.  He also created The Essex Soul Night Specials, along with Dave Gregory. These live shows attracted over 250,000 people in the late 1980s.

In 2000, John left Essex FM and went on to work for Dream 107 in Chelmsford and Invicta Radio. In 2005 John was head hunted by Time 107.5 to present a daily show over East London and Essex.

John is now broadcasting on air with Time 107.5 presenting and producing their daily Drive Show and on Dance Decades, the station's daily soul programme.

John increased his work for the BBC in 2013. The John Leech Soul Show is on the BBC Eastern Region every Sunday. The programme can be heard on BBC Essex, Suffolk, Norfolk, Northampton, Cambridgeshire and BBC Three Counties Radio.

His Friday Essex Soul Night broadcast on BBC Essex between 6.00pm and 10.00pm has become a fixture and has won many accolades from his listeners during lockdown.

References

External links
 
 John Leech Soul Show - BBC Radio Essex
 Twitter Page

Living people
English DJs
Year of birth missing (living people)